Bothriochloa macra, commonly known as red-leg grass, red grass, redleg or pitted beard grass is a perennial grass species that is native to eastern Australia and New Zealand. It is naturalised in Tasmania and Norfolk Island.

References

macra
Bunchgrasses of Australasia
Grasses of New Zealand
Poales of Australia
Flora of the Australian Capital Territory
Flora of New South Wales
Flora of Queensland
Flora of South Australia
Flora of Victoria (Australia)